Mahajilo is a river in Menabe, western Madagascar. It is formed by the affluents of the Sakay river and Kitsamby river. It flows down from the central highlands, to flow into the Tsiribihina River.

Rafting trips are purposed by several operators on this river from Miandrivazo.

References

Rivers of Madagascar
Rivers of Menabe
Rivers of Bongolava
Tsiribihina River